Benjamin David "Jamie" Elman (born July 5, 1976) is a Canadian American actor, best known for his leading roles of Cody Miller on YTV's Student Bodies, Luke Foley in NBC's American Dreams, and himself in Yidlife Crisis.

Life and career
Elman was born in New York City, and was raised in Montreal, Quebec. He attended Jewish day school in Montreal and has taught fourth-graders at a synagogue religious school in Southern California.

In Montreal, Elman began performing in plays such as The Children's Hour and Annie Get Your Gun before landing his first roles in TV (Are You Afraid of the Dark?) and film (Johnny Mnemonic). Elman graduated from McGill University with a BA in English.

He was part of the ensemble cast of the film Shattered Glass opposite Hayden Christensen and Peter Sarsgaard, and has guest-starred on numerous popular series including Crossing Jordan, Criminal Minds, Without a Trace, CSI: NY and The Closer. Recent roles include starring opposite Armand Assante in California Dreaming which won the Un Certain Regard award at the 2007 Cannes Film Festival; portraying a young Sigmund Freud, again opposite Assante and Ben Cross, in When Nietzsche Wept; and on the small screen, where he improvised with Larry David in HBO's Curb Your Enthusiasm.

In 2009, Elman began work on his first webseries titled Brainstorm for Dailymotion.com. In April 2010, Elman appeared on the soap opera The Young and the Restless as Jamie Peterson.

Elman and Eli Batalion direct and act in YidLife Crisis, a series of short comedy sketches about two 30-something Jewish friends. Most of the dialog is in Yiddish, which the two use as a secret language, but subtitles are provided in English and French. The duo performed at Montreal's Segal Centre for Performing Arts for a week in January 2022.

Filmography

Film

Television

Video games

References

External links

 
 
 Jamie's SpeedReel
 YidLife Crisis

1976 births
American male film actors
American male television actors
Canadian male film actors
Canadian male television actors
Jewish American male actors
Jewish Canadian male actors
Living people
Male actors from Montreal
Male actors from New York City
McGill University alumni
Yiddish-language satirists
21st-century American Jews